James Jessie Murphy (born October 10, 1959) was a receiver for eight seasons with the Winnipeg Blue Bombers of the Canadian Football League.

Career
Murphy played for the Bombers from 1982-1990.  He was named the league's Most Outstanding Player in 1986 and was a two-time All-Star.  He helped the Bombers to three Grey Cup victories and finished his career with 9,036 receiving yards, which was the Blue Bombers record until it was broken by Milt Stegall.

He was elected into the Canadian Football Hall of Fame in 2000 and was selected as one of the Blue Bombers 20 All-Time Greats in 2005.

Murphy was inducted into the Manitoba Sports Hall of Fame in 2009.

References

1959 births
Living people
American players of Canadian football
Canadian Football Hall of Fame inductees
Canadian Football League Most Outstanding Player Award winners
Canadian football wide receivers
Kansas City Chiefs players
People from DeLand, Florida
Players of American football from Florida
Sportspeople from Volusia County, Florida
Utah State Aggies football players
Winnipeg Blue Bombers players